Pâ is a department or commune of Balé Province in southern Burkina Faso. Its capital is the town of Pâ. According to the 2019 census the department has a total population of 27,011.

Towns and villages
Largest towns and villages and populations in the department are as follows:

 Pâ 	(15 170 inhabitants) (capital)
 Boro	(1 300 inhabitants)
 Didié	                (1 234 inhabitants)
 Hérédougou	        (957 inhabitants)
 Kopoï	                (2 493 inhabitants)
 Koupelé	                (731 inhabitants)
 Voho	                (1 453 inhabitants)
 Yamané	(1 820 inhabitants)

References

Departments of Burkina Faso
Balé Province